Ban Phachi Junction is a railway junction located in Phachi District, Ayutthaya Province, Thailand. It is a Class 1 Station and serves as a junction for the North and Northeastern Line of the State Railway of Thailand. Ban Phachi Junction had to be rebuilt after the Second World War after being hit by Allied Bombing. Some super express and express trains do not call at this station.

There is also a specialty at this station that is recommended for those who pass this station. That is the "Phachi" Coconut Ice Cream sold by hawkers with trays walking along platforms and is normally eaten using a plastic straw (as it will melt easily). The dessert is quite famous and has been mentioned on some Thai shows. But since the beginning of August 2018 Phachi Coconut Ice Cream was sold at this junction, sales ended permanently.

Train services
Ban Phachi Junction serves 47 trains daily. The trains that stop here are of the following:
 Commuter 303/304 Bangkok–Lopburi–Bangkok (No.303 Service on Monday to Friday)
 Commuter 339/340 Bangkok–Kaeng Khoi Junction–Bangkok (Service on Monday to Friday)
 Local 409 Ayutthaya–Lopburi
 Rapid 135/140 Bangkok–Ubon Ratchathani–Bangkok
 Rapid 111/108 Bangkok–Den Chai–Bangkok
 Express 75/78 Bangkok–Nong Khai–Bangkok
 Express 77/76 Bangkok–Nong Khai–Bangkok
 Ordinary 201/202 Bangkok–Phitsanulok–Bangkok
 Express 71/72 Bangkok–Ubon Ratchathani–Bangkok
 Ordinary 209/210 Bangkok–Ban Takhli–Bangkok
 Ordinary 233/234 Bangkok–Surin–Bangkok
 Rapid 109/102 Bangkok–Chiang Mai–Bangkok
 Ordinary 211/212 Bangkok–Taphan Hin–Bangkok
 Ordinary 207/208 Bangkok–Nakhon Sawan–Bangkok
 Rapid 145/136 Bangkok–Ubon Ratchathani–Bangkok
 Commuter 301/302 Bangkok–Lopburi–Bangkok
 Commuter 313/314 Bangkok–Ban Phachi–Bangkok (Service on Monday to Friday)
 Commuter 341/342 Bangkok–Kaeng Khoi–Bangkok
 Commuter 317/318 Bangkok–Lopburi–Bangkok (Service on Monday to Friday)
 Rapid 139/146 Bangkok–Ubon Ratchathani–Bangkok
 Rapid 107/112 Bangkok–Den Chai–Bangkok
 Rapid 105/106 Bangkok–Sila At–Bangkok
 Rapid 133/134 Bangkok–Nong Khai–Bangkok
 Express 67/68 Bangkok–Ubon Ratchathani–Bangkok
 Rapid 141/142 Bangkok–Ubon Ratchathani–Bangkok

References
 
 
 
 

Railway stations in Thailand